The Insect Woman is a 1972 South Korean film directed by Kim Ki-young.

Plot
A melodrama about a professor under psychiatric care because of a mental breakdown due to the stress brought on by an extramarital affair.

Cast
Youn Yuh-jung as Lee Myung Ja
Jeon Gye-hyeon 
Namkoong Won as Dong Shik
Kim Ju-mi
Park In-chan 
Lee Dae-keun
Kim Ho-jeong
Sin Jong-seop
Hwang Baek
Park Am

Release
In February 2012, Taewon Entertainment, in partnership with the Korean Film Archive, had released the film on DVD.

Awards
Baeksang Arts Awards (1973)
Best Director (Kim Ki-young)
Best Actor (Namkoong Won)

References

Bibliography

External links

1970s Korean-language films
South Korean drama films
Films directed by Kim Ki-young